Candanchú  is a ski resort situated  near the town of Canfranc in the High Aragon of the western Pyrenees (province of Huesca, Spain).  The name of the area is an adaptation of French "Camp d'Anjou" as this was originally the site of a military camp of the French Angevin dynasty.  This is also located near the road on the historical Camino de Santiago. The ski resort of Candanchú is located in the Aragonese Pyrenees. It is 1 km from Puerto del Somport the border with France. Neighbor Astún ski resort, is located 27 km north of the city of Jaca. On the right bank of the river Arago, near the bridge of Santa Cristina, are the ruins of the Hospital of Santa Cristina of Somport, a hospice for pilgrims on the Camino de Santiago.

The resort
It has 59 km of marked pistes, it's one of the earliest developed resorts of the Pyrenees. It's known for its very difficult steep pistes such as Tubo Zapatilla. The highest point is La Tuca peak, 2400 m AMSL, with a vertical drop of 900 m.

The base of the resort is a purpose-built town which includes several hotels and apartments and is situated at 1500 m AMSL. From there the main chair lifts provide access for the resort. The resort itself occupies two different high mountain valleys, defining two sectors: Pista Grande - El Tobazo, and La Tuca. The first one is the lower sector where the main town and the parking are situated, the upper La Tuca valley is accessed from there using a chair lift.

Candanchú offers a joint ski pass with the neighbouring resort of Astún.

Lifts
Almost all of the resort's lifts are modern and of high capacity, the resort has:

 6 chair lifts.
 18 ski tows.

Pistes
The resort offers 51 pistes of different difficulties:

 10 beginners. 
  11 easy.
  18 intermediate.
  12 expert.

In addition there is a 35 km cross-country ski circuit shared with the adjacent Somport resort, in France.

Services

 6 restaurants.
 1 skiing school, Spain's oldest.
 1 snow garden for children.
 1 kindergarten
 5 ski hiring stores.

External links
 http://www.candanchu.com - Official resort site.
 http://www.candanchu.info

Ski areas and resorts in Aragon
Pyrenees